Evergreen Cemetery is a public cemetery located on Evergreen Street in Santa Cruz, California and was established in the 1850s. Since 2008, the Evergreen Cemetery is under the management of the Santa Cruz Museum of Art and History (MAH).

About 
The Evergreen Cemetery is built on 8 acres of land, and features wrought iron fences around some family grave sites. It is located near Harvey West Park.

The cemetery is divided into five sections including the Grand Army of the Republic; the Freemasons; the main section; the "evergreen extension" added in the 1940s; and the Chinese section (due to the anti-Chinese sentiment, which led to the Chinese Exclusion Act of 1882). The Chinese section of the cemetery allowed for traditional Chinese funerals featuring firecrackers, processions and a Chinese oven-onsite for food served. The Santa Cruz Museum of Art and History oversaw the construction of a Chinese gate in 2014, to honor those buried. The Grand Army of the Republic section, was created by a fraternal organization of the American Civil War veterans honoring those who fought to end slavery and supported the Union.

This cemetery is said to be haunted.

History 
The land for Evergreen Cemetery was a gift from the Imus family. An early burial at this cemetery was a baby named Julia Arcan, who died in Death Valley in 1850. Some say the first burial was in 1858, when Harry Speel fell off a cliff at what is now called Cowell Beach.

In 1955, there was a Christmas flood and it left the cemetery in poor shape, and over time the cemetery was with overgrown plants and toppled gravestones. In 1973, Renie Leaman led an effort to restore the cemetery.

Notable burials 

 Isaac Graham (1800–1863), fur trader, mountain man, and land grantee.
 Lucien Heath (1819–1888), farmer, merchant, and politician in Oregon.
Hiram A. Imus Jr. (1804–1875), politician, member of the California State Assembly.

See also 
 List of cemeteries in California
 Pioneer cemetery

References 

1850 establishments in California
Cemeteries in Santa Cruz County, California
Chinese cemeteries
Cemeteries established in the 1850s